Prospect Hill Cemetery Building is a historic burial vault located in Prospect Hill Cemetery at Guilderland in Albany County, New York.  It was built in 1863 and is a small one story cobblestone building.  It has a slate covered gable roof. It is built of coursed cobblestones with smooth ashlar quoins and a stone lintel above the door.

It was listed on the National Register of Historic Places in 1982.

References

External links
 

Cemeteries on the National Register of Historic Places in New York (state)
Buildings and structures completed in 1863
Cobblestone architecture
Cemeteries in Albany County, New York
National Register of Historic Places in Albany County, New York